Zhav Marg-e Mohammad Morad (also Romanized as Zhāv Marg-e Moḩammad Morād) is a village in Gowavar Rural District, Govar District, Gilan-e Gharb County, Kermanshah Province, Iran. At the 2006 census, its population was 67, in 11 families.

References 

Populated places in Gilan-e Gharb County